Molly Clark Haskell (born September 29, 1939) is an American feminist film critic and author. She contributed to The Village Voice—first as a theatre critic, then as a movie reviewer—and from there moved on to New York magazine and Vogue. Her most influential book is From Reverence to Rape: The Treatment of Women in the Movies (1974; revised and reissued in 1987). She co-hosted Turner Classic Movies' The Essentials with Robert Osborne in 2006 for one season.

Early life
Molly Haskell was born in Charlotte, North Carolina, and grew up in Richmond, Virginia. She attended St. Catherine's School, Sweet Briar College, the University of London and the Collège de Sorbonne before settling in New York. In the 1960s, she worked for the French Film Office, where she wrote a newsletter about that country's films for the New York press and served as an interpreter for French film directors attending openings of their movies in New York.

Career
Haskell then worked at The Village Voice, and became a movie reviewer. Haskell finally found a steady career with New York magazine and Vogue.

In the documentary For the Love of Movies: The Story of American Film Criticism (2009), Haskell discusses her time at Village Voice in the 1960s when she looked at film dually, "both as a film lover and as a feminist" and of how, at a young age, she was affected by the French film, Les Diaboliques (1955).  She is one of the main contributors to the 2013 documentary "In Search of the Ideal Male: Made in Hollywood" where she explores the evolution of gender roles in Hollywood.

The publications Haskell has written for include The New York Times, The Guardian, Esquire, The Nation, Town and Country Magazine, the New York Observer, The New York Review of Books, and Film Comment. She was Artistic Director of the Sarasota French Film Festival, has served on the selection committee of the New York Film Festival, and been associate Professor of Film at Barnard College and Adjunct Professor of Film at Columbia University.

Haskell participated in the 2012 Sight & Sound critics' poll, where she listed her ten favorite films as follows: À Nos Amours, Au Hasard Balthazar, The Awful Truth, Chinatown, Claire's Knee, I Know Where I'm Going!, Madame de..., The Shop Around the Corner, Sunrise: A Song of Two Humans, and Vertigo.

Personal life
Haskell was married to fellow film critic Andrew Sarris, who died on June 20, 2012.

Honors and awards
In 2013, Haskell received an Athena Film Festival Award for her leadership, creativity and the extraordinary example she sets for other women in the field. She was American Academy of Arts and Sciences Fellow of 2019.

Works

 From Reverence to Rape: The Treatment of Women in the Movies (1974; revised and reissued in 1987); .
 Love and Other Infectious Diseases: A Memoir. New York: William Morrow, 1990, .
 Holding My Own in No Man's Land: Women and Men and Films and Feminists. New York: Oxford University Press, 1997, .
 Frankly, My Dear: "Gone with the Wind" Revisited. New Haven, Conn.: Yale University Press, 2009, .
 Mary Pickford: Queen of the Movies. Lexington, Kentucky: University Press of Kentucky, 2012. 
 My Brother My Sister: A Story of Transformation. New York: Viking, 2013, .
 Steven Spielberg: A Life in Films (Jewish Lives). Yale University Press, 2017.

References

External links
Official homepage
Articles by Molly Haskell in The Guardian
Papers of Molly Haskell, 1892-2016 (inclusive), 1970-2010 (bulk): A Finding Aid. Schlesinger Library, Radcliffe Institute, Harvard University.

Living people
20th-century American women writers
21st-century American women writers
Alumni of the University of London
American feminist writers
American film critics
National Society of Film Critics Members
American women film critics
American film historians
Barnard College faculty
Columbia University faculty
Film theorists
Sweet Briar College alumni
University of Paris alumni
Writers from Richmond, Virginia
1939 births
Historians from Virginia
American women historians